Micrulia gyroducta is a moth in the family Geometridae. It was described by David Stephen Fletcher in 1957. It is found on the Louisiade Archipelago, Rennell Island and Mefor Island.

References

Moths described in 1957
Eupitheciini